100 Contemporary Artists A-Z is a two-volume edition contemporary art compendium. It is the 25th anniversary special edition and it features one hundred contemporary artists from TASCHEN's seminal Art Now! 4 and Art at the Turn of the Millennium series. The biographies are available in English, French and German. The compilation was edited by Hans Werner Holzwarth.

Contents
The artists are covered in two volumes, forty-nine in 100 Contemporary Artists A-K and fifty-one in 100 Contemporary Artists L-Z. On the front cover of the first volume is a representation of Peter Doig's Figures in Red Boat (2005–07) and on the back cover Olafur Eliasson's The Weather Project (2003) is represented. The second volume’s front cover shows Wolfgang Tillmans' Freischwimmer 20 (2003) while the back cover highlights Kara Walker's For the Benefit of All the Races of Mankind (2002).

Reception
A review by ABC News described 100 Contemporary Artists A-Z as "... a comprehensive study of contemporary art at the beginning of the 21st century. At 704 pages, it's nearly 12 pounds of art for your viewing pleasure".

The painter Chris Huen Sin Kan credits the book with inspiring him to pursue art.

See also
 Taschen
 Taschen Basic Architecture
 Taschen Basic Art

References

External links 
 Publisher site

Contemporary artists
Taschen books
Books about visual art
2009 non-fiction books